BCHS may refer to one of the following organizations:
Brome County Historical Society, Knowlton, Quebec
Bronx County Historical Society

BCHS may also refer to one of the following Christian high schools:

Bakersfield Christian High School in Bakersfield, California
Brethren Christian Junior/Senior High School in Huntington Beach, California

BCHS may also refer to one of the following Catholic high schools:

Berks Catholic High School in Reading, Pennsylvania
Bergen Catholic High School in Oradell, New Jersey
Bishop Canevin High School in Pittsburgh, Pennsylvania
Bishop Carroll Catholic High School in Wichita, Kansas
Bishop Carroll High School (Calgary, Alberta) in Canada
Bishop Carroll High School (Ebensburg, Pennsylvania)
Bishop Chatard High School in Indianapolis, Indiana
Boston College High School in Boston, Massachusetts
Bourgade Catholic High School in Phoenix, Arizona

BCHS may also refer to one of the following public high schools:
 In the United States
 Baker County High School (Newton, Georgia)
 Baker County High School (Glen St. Mary, Florida)
Baldwin County High School in Bay Minette, Alabama
Banks County High School in Homer, Georgia
Barron Collier High School in Naples, Florida
Barren County High School in Glasgow, Kentucky
Bath County High School in Owingsville, Kentucky
Bath County High School (Virginia) in Hot Springs, Virginia
Bay City High School in Bay City, Texas
Belle Chasse High School in Belle Chasse, Louisiana
Benton Central Junior-Senior High School in Fowler, Indiana
Benton Consolidated High School in Benton, Illinois
Bethlehem Central High School in Delmar, New York
Big Creek High School in War, West Virginia
Bleckley County High School in Cochran, Georgia
Boca Ciega High School in Gulfport, Florida
Boulder Creek High School in Anthem, Arizona
Bradley Central High School in Cleveland, Tennessee
Brantley County High School in Nahunta, Georgia
Brookfield Central High School in Brookfield, Wisconsin
Brooklyn Center High School in Brooklyn Center, Minnesota
Bryan Collegiate High School in Bryan, Texas
Burke County High School in Waynesboro, Georgia
Burlington City High School in Burlington, New Jersey
Business Careers High School in San Antonio, Texas
 Elsewhere
Baie-Comeau High School in Baie-Comeau, Quebec, Canada
Brentwood County High School in Brentwood, Essex, England
Burlington Central High School in Burlington, Ontario, Canada
Baghdad College High School in Baghdad, Iraq